The Großer Ehrenberg is a mountain, and the highest peak in the Thuringian part of the Harz mountains. It is also the highest point of the county of Nordhausen in Germany.

Location 
The Großer Ehrenberg lies in the South Harz within the South Harz Nature Park. It rises around 2.5 kilometres west of Rothesütte and about 3.5 kilometres north-northwest of  Sülzhayn, which both belong to Ellrich. To the north the terrain drops into the valley of the Großer Kunzenbach and, to the west, into the valley of the Kleiner Kunzenbach which each flow along the border between Thuringian and Lower Saxony and merge to form the Kunzenbach immediately west of, and below, the mountain. The eastern spur of the mountain is the Dornkopf. This spur and the Großer Ehrenberg itslet are passed by the Landesstraße 1014, which branches off the Bundesstraße 4 between the tripoint of the states of Lower Saxony, Saxony-Anhalt and Thuringia und Rothesütte and runs from there roughly in a north–south direction to Sülzhayn. Both peaks are accessible inter alia from this road on forest tracks.

Inner-German Border 
The old Inner German Border used to run along the valleys of the Großer Kunzenbach and Kleiner Kunzenbach to the north and west of, and below, the Großer Ehrenberg. However, the Iron Curtain, including the convoy track, ran right over the summit. Today the German Green Belt runs over the mountain. To the northeast of the peak on the former Inner German Border at the tripoint of the three states is the Dreiländerstein.

Height 

Footnotes and references

See also 
 List of mountains and hills of the Harz

Mountains under 1000 metres
Mountains of the Harz
Mountains of Thuringia